The Selangor Islamic University also known as UIS is a private university located in Bandar Seri Putra, Bangi, Selangor. The university was formerly a university college, before upgraded to a full-fledged university on 13 October 2022. The Sultan of Selangor, Sultan Sharafuddin Idris Shah, had presented the official instrument of the change to Higher Education Ministry secretary-general Abdul Razak Jaafar at Istana Bukit Kayangan. The university moved to its current location in 2000, when the new campus was officially opened by Sultan Sharafuddin Idris Shah.

Rectors
The list of Rectors since the institution was established.

Management

Rector : Prof. Madya Dato' Dr. Mohd Farid Ravi Bin Abdullah

Deputy Rector Academic & International : Prof. Madya Dr. Zetty Nurzuliana Binti Rashed

Deputy Rector Students Affairs & Alumni : Dr. Abdul Razif Bin Zaini

Deputy Rector Research, Industry & Community Partnerships : Prof. Madya Dr. Mokmin Bin Basri

Registrar : En. Zulhizzam Bin Hamzah

Bursary : Pn. Nor Hafizin Binti Abdul Wahab

Legal Advisor : Pn. Rohaiza Binti Mat Noh

Chief Librarian : Hajah Noorlia Binti Ramli

Director of Centre of Graduate Studies : Prof Madya Dr. Hairol Anuar Bin Mak Din

Dean of Centre of Matriculation : Dr. Nor Effendy Bin Ahmad Sokri

Dean of Centre of Core Studies : Dr. Muhammad Yosef Bin Niteh

Dean of Faculty of Islamic Studies  Civilization : Dr. Md Noor Bin Hussin

Dean of Faculty of Management & Muamalah : Dr. Norziah Binti Othman

Dean of Faculty of Education : Dr. Sapie Bin Sabilan

Dean of Faculty of Science & Information Technology : Ts. Dr. Juzlinda Binti Md. Ghazali

Dean of Faculty of Syariah & Law : Dr. Nora'inan Binti Bahari

Faculties and Centres
 Centre of Graduate Studies
 Centre of Matriculation
 Faculty of Islamic Studies  Civilization
 Faculty of Management & Muamalah
 Faculty of Education
 Faculty of Information Technology & Multimedia
 Faculty of Syariah & Law
 Faculty of Social Science

Programmes Offered

- Faculty of Islamic Studies Civilization

 Diploma Pengajian Bahasa Al-Quran
 Diploma Akidah dan Pemikiran Islam
 Diploma Al-Quran dan As-Sunnah
 Diploma Dakwah
 Diploma Tahfiz Al-Quran dan Al-Qiraat
 Sarjana Muda Al-Quran dan Al-Sunnah dengan Komunikasi (Kepujian)
 Sarjana Muda Usuluddin dengan Multimedia (Kepujian)
 Sarjana Muda Al-Quran dan Al-Qiraat (Kepujian)
 Sarjana Muda Dakwah dengan Pengurusan Sumber Insan (Kepujian)
 Sarjana Muda Pengajian Islam (Bahasa Arab dengan Multimedia) (Kepujian)
 Sarjana Muda Pengajian Bahasa Al-Quran (Kepujian)
 Sarjana Muda Pengajian Islam (Bahasa Arab Terjemahan) (Kepujian)
 Sarjana Usuluddin & Pemikiran Islam
 Sarjana Usuluddin (Perbandingan Agama)
 Sarjana Pengajian Al-Hadis
 Sarjana Pengajian Al-Quran
 Sarjana Pengajian Ilmu Qiraat
 Sarjana Dakwah & Pembangunan Komuniti
 Sarjana Bahasa Arab untuk Tujuan Khusus
 Doktor Falsafah (Islamiyyat)
 Doktor Falsafah (Pengajian Bahasa Arab)

- Faculty of Management & Muamalah

 Diploma Perakaunan
 Diploma Pengurusan Perniagaan
 Diploma Perbankan Islam
 Diploma Pengurusan Sumber Manusia
 Diploma Komunikasi
 Diploma Pengajian Bahasa Inggeris
 Sarjana Muda Pentadbiran Perniagaan dengan E-Dagang (Kepujian)
 Sarjana Muda Pengurusan Sumber Insan (Kepujian)
 Sarjana Muda Ekonomi dan Kewangan (Kepujian)
 Sarjana Muda Perakaunan (Kepujian)
 Sarjana Muda Kewangan Islam (Perbankan) (Kepujian) 
 Sarjana Muda Komunikasi (Penyiaran) (Kepujian)
 Sarjana Muda Pengurusan (Industri Halal) (Kepujian)
 Sarjana Muda Bahasa Inggeris dengan Komunikasi Koporat (Kepujian)
 Sarjana Pentadbiran Perniagaan (Muamalah)
 Sarjana Pengurusan Sumber Manusia
 Sarjana Ekonomi
 Sarjana Kewangan Islam
 Sarjana Perakaunan
 Sarjana Komunikasi
 Doktor Falsafah (Pengurusan)
 Doktor Falsafah (Perakaunan)

- Faculty of Education

 Diploma Perguruan ( Pengajaran Bahasa Arab Sebagai Bahasa Kedua) 
 Diploma in Teaching (Teaching English as a Second Language) 
 Diploma Perguruan (Pendidikan Islam)
 Diploma Perguruan (Pendidikan Awal Kanak-Kanak)
 Bachelor of Education (Hons) Teaching English as a Second Language (TESL) with Multimedia
 Sarjana Muda Pendidikan Islam Dengan Multimedia (Kepujian)
 Sarjana Muda Pendidikan Tahfiz Al-Quran & Al-Qiraat (Kepujian)
 Sarjana Muda Pendidikan Awal Kanak-Kanak (Kepujian)
 Sarjana Muda Pendidikan Bimbingan & Kaunseling (Kepujian)
 Sarjana Muda Pendidikan Sukan & Rekreasi (Kepujian)
 Sarjana Muda Pendidikan Khas (Kepujian)
 Sarjana Pendidikan (Pendidikan Islam)
 Sarjana Pendidikan (Pendidikan Bahasa)
 Sarjana Pendidikan (Kurikulum & Pedagogi)
 Sarjana Pendidikan (Pentadbiran Pendidikan)
 Sarjana Pendidikan (Teknologi Pendidikan)
 Doktor Falsafah (Pendidikan)

- Faculty of Information Technology & Multimedia

 Diploma Multimedia
 Diploma Sains Komputer
 Sarjana Muda Multimedia Kreatif (Media Interaktif) (Kepujian)
 Sarjana Muda Teknologi Maklumat (Teknologi Rangkaian) (Kepujian)
 Sarjana Muda Multimedia Kreatif (Rekabentuk Digital) (Kepujian)
 Sarjana Muda Sistem Maklumat (Kepujian)
 Sarjana Teknologi Maklumat
 Sarjana Sains (Multimedia Kreatif)
 Doktor Falsafah (Teknologi Maklumat)

- Faculty of Syariah & Law

 Diploma Pengajian Syariah
 Diploma Syariah & Perundangan Islam
 Sarjana Muda Syariah dengan Undang-Undang (Kepujian)
 Sarjana Muda Syariah dengan Muamalat (Kepujian)
 Sarjana Syariah (Pengurusan)
 Sarjana Syariah Undang-Undang

References

External links
 Official Kolej Universiti Antarabangsa Selangor Website
 Diploma in E-Commerce Technology
 KUIS Students E-Portal

Private universities and colleges in Malaysia
Colleges in Malaysia
Universities and colleges in Selangor
Islamic universities and colleges in Malaysia
Educational institutions established in 1995
1995 establishments in Malaysia
Educational institutions in Malaysia